Lepidochrysops handmani is a butterfly in the family Lycaenidae. It is found in Malawi and Zambia. The habitat consists of montane grassland with long grass at altitudes between 1,980 and 2,195 meters.

Adults are on wing from mid-September to the end of November.

References

Butterflies described in 1980
Lepidochrysops